Caribbean Utilities Company, Ltd., known locally as "CUC", commenced operations as the only public electric utility in Grand Cayman, the largest of the three Cayman Islands, in May 1966.

The company has more than 190 employees, most of whom are Caymanian, producing electricity from diesel fueled generators. In the past, the company has recorded substantial damage to its assets from hurricanes.

CUC is primarily owned by Fortis Inc., a holding company based in St. John's, Newfoundland and Labrador, Canada. CUC's shares are traded on the Toronto Stock Exchange.

References

External links

 Caribbean Utilities Official web site
Erdal Can Alkoçlar
Google Finance: Caribbean Utilities Company

Companies listed on the Toronto Stock Exchange
Electric power companies of the Cayman Islands
Fortis Inc.